Sobociński (feminine Sobocińska) is a Polish surname. Notable people with the surname include:

 Piotr Sobociński (1958–2001), Polish cinematographer, son of Witold Sobociński
 Remigiusz Sobociński, Polish footballer
 Witold Sobociński (1929–2018), Polish cinematographer, father of Piotr Sobociński

Polish-language surnames